Anyuan may refer to the following locations in Jiangxi, China:

Anyuan County (安远县)
Anyuan District (安源区), Pingxiang
Anyuan, Anyuan District (安源镇), town in said district

See also

Antuan